Adush Muça Stadium is a multi-use stadium in Ballsh, Albania.  It is currently used mostly for football matches and is the home ground of Bylis.  The stadium has a capacity of 5,200 people.

Renovation
In 2012, with the backing of the club's owners, the Albanian Football Association and the MTKRS, the stadium was renovated. A new pitch was laid and the ground's facilities were modernised as well 3,000 plastic seats being installed in the stands. Work on the stadium was completed in September 2012 and Bylis Ballsh's first game at the ground was a 2-0 Albanian Cup win over Tërbuni.

References

KF Bylis Ballsh
Football venues in Albania
Multi-purpose stadiums in Albania
Buildings and structures in Mallakastër